The Governor of San Juan is a citizen of the San Juan Province, in Argentina, holding the office of governor for the corresponding period. The governor is elected alongside a vice-governor.  the Governor of San Juan is Sergio Uñac.

Governors since 1983

See also
 Chamber of Deputies of San Juan

References

 
San Juan Province
G